"Honest Men" is the debut single by ELO Part II. It is the second track on their self-titled debut album. It peaked at No. 36 on the Dutch Single Top 100 and at No. 60 on the UK Singles Chart.

Overview 
A music video of "Honest Men" was first aired in June 1991.

Music & Media noted "Honest Men" as sounding very similar to ELO Part II's predecessor Electric Light Orchestra. In his review of the album, Doug Stone of AllMusic said, "…'Honest Men', 'Every Night', and 'Heart of Hearts' imitate the band's glory daze to the point of enjoyability".

The single's B-side, "Love For Sale", was a song written by Bev Bevan and Pete Haycock. "Love For Sale" only appeared as a B-side to "Honest Men" and thus did not appear on the album.

Track listing 

CD

 "Honest Men" (remix) – 4:25
 "Love For Sale" – 4:14
 "Honest Men" (full version) – 6:13

12" Vinyl

 "Honest Men" (full version) – 6:13
 "Love For Sale" – 4:14
 "Honest Men" (remix) – 4:25

7" Vinyl, Cassette

 "Honest Men" (remix) – 4:25
 "Love For Sale" – 4:14

Personnel 
Personnel list according to the inner sleeve.

ELO Part II

 Bev Bevan – drums, percussion, backing vocals
 Pete Haycock – guitars, bass, backing vocals
 Eric Troyer – keyboards, lead and backing vocals
 Neil Lockwood – backing vocals

Additional Personnel

 Jeff Glixman - producer
 Don Arden - executive producer
 Louis Clark - string arrangement
 Ron McPherson - art and design

Charts

References 

Song recordings produced by Jeff Glixman
1991 songs
1991 debut singles
Telstar Records singles